In Greek mythology, Lipara (Ancient Greek: Λιπάρα means "oily, shiny with oil") was one of the Hesperides and sister to Asterope, Chrysothemis, Hygieia.

Note 

Hesperides
Greek goddesses